The men's triple jump at the 1934 European Athletics Championships was held in Turin, Italy, at the  Stadio Benito Mussolini on 9 September 1934.

Medalists

Results

Final
9 September

Participation
According to an unofficial count, 11 athletes from 7 countries participated in the event.

 (1)
 (2)
 (2)
 (2)
 (1)
 (1)
 (2)

References

Triple jump
Triple jump at the European Athletics Championships